, can refer either to a series of short manga stories written by Rumiko Takahashi or to a series of original video animations (OVAs) based on those stories.
Most of the stories are comedies.
The OVAs were released in North American and United Kingdom by Central Park Media and Manga Entertainment.

Japanese Editions

The Rumic World stories were originally published separately in various Shogakukan magazines. Rumic World was released twice in Japan, the first edition, utilized the tankobon format, and consisted of three volumes:

First Edition
Volume 1
 
 
 
 

Volume 2
 
 
 
 
 
 
 
 

Volume 3
 
 
  (also Dust Spot!!) (consists of five chapters)

Second edition
The second edition, in wideban format, contained the same stories, reduced into two volumes, with the stories in a different order:

Volume 1
 
 
 
  (also Dust Spot!!) (consists of five chapters)
 
 

Volume 2
 
 
 
 
 
 
 
 
 

One or Double
Another collection of similar short stories not included in either of the first two editions, was titled either , or  This book also uses the wideban format, and contains the following stories:

 
 
 
 
 
 
 
 
 

Came the Mirror
Another collection of similar short stories, titled , was released in 2015 and contains the following stories:

 
 
 
 
 
 My Sweet Sunday (collaboration with Mitsuru Adachi to commemorate the 50th anniversary of Shonen Sunday)

Translations
English editions
Some of Takahashi's stories were printed in Manga Vizion magazine in a "flipped" style and are no longer in print.

Rumic World
While Viz Media initially published two Rumic World stories in 1989 and 1990, it published a three volume set of the Rumic World collection in 1997, corresponding to the Japanese editions, with a different order to the stories:

Volume 1 

"Fire Tripper": A gas explosion sends young Suzuko and Shuu 500 years into the past.
"Maris the Chojo": An alien policeman sees a kidnapped quadrillionaire as her ticket out of debt.
"Those Selfish Aliens": Aliens, the government, and fishermen implant bombs in a poor individual.
"Time Warp Trouble": Warriors from feudal Japan inexplicably pop into a modern high-school classroom.
"The Laughing Target": Azusa will do anything to ensure that Yuzuru stays hers.

Volume 2

"Wasted Minds (Dust Spot)": A five-part miniseries which follows a pair of bickering government agents. 
"The Golden Gods of Poverty": A boy's parents try to use him to make money.
"The Entrepreneurial Spirit": A woman leads seminars for a get-rich quick scheme.

Volume 3

"That Darn Cat": Rumiko Takahashi takes care of her neighbor's cat.
"": A couple befriend a sickly child with a secret.
"Wedded Bliss": A wedded couple's only outlet is to fight with one another.
"Sleep and Forget": A girl relives a past life involving her lover.
"A Cry for Help": A fairy gives a boy a frightening split personality.
"War Council": Student councils go to war over a stamp.
"The Face Pack": A man can change his appearance at will.

One or Double
Viz Media published a book corresponding to the "One or Double" collection under the title  on June 5, 1998. It contained the following stories:
"Excuse Me for Being a Dog!": A boxer tries to hide the fact that he turns into a dog every time he gets a nose bleed.
"Winged Victory": A rugby team with 999 losses is cheered on by a ghostly girl .
"The Grandfather of All Baseball Games": A man wastes the money his grandson makes playing sandlot baseball.
"The Diet Goddess": A young girl goes through a rigorous training exercise to fit into a dress.
"Happy Talk": A girl searches for her dead mother, who she thinks might be working as a hostess in Tokyo.
"One or Double": An accident places the soul of a fanatic kendo coach into his favorite pupil's girlfriend.
"To Grandmother's House We Go": A woman poses as her dead friend to claim a 500 billion yen inheritance.
"Reserved Seat": A singer deals with stage fright and memory blackouts after his grandmother dies. 
"Shake Your Buddha": A hilarious debate between the future Buddha and an idiot yam fanatic.

Came the Mirror
 Viz Media published "Came the Mirror" collection under the title  on February 15, 2022.

See alsoRumic Theater''

Notes and references

External links
  Description on Furinkan.com

 
Manga anthologies
1994 manga
Viz Media manga
Works by Rumiko Takahashi